Katja Schumacher (* 9 April 1968 in Heidelberg) is a German triathlete and Ironman triathlete, and previous German champion in both of these disciplines.

Career 
Katja Schumacher grew up in Heidelberg. Her uncle was the Austrian alpine ski racer Toni Sailer.

After the 2004 Frankfurt Ironman race, Schumacher was banned for one year by the disciplinary committee of the Triathlon Union (DTU). Schumacher fought back against the positive A- und B-tests, and denied ever having taken illegal performance-enhancing drugs. Due to the uncertainty of the case, the ban was lifted after 10 months, and the disciplinary commission decided that the case should not be referred to as a "ban".

After this case, Schumacher quickly returned to competition, and after some years in the US, returned to live in Heidelberg. In 2005 and 2008 she won the German middle-distance Triathlon championship (2 km swimming, 85 km cycling and 20 km running). Besides these races, she won four long-distance Ironman triathlons (in 1998, 2001, 2002 and 2006) and two 70.3 Ironman races (2002 and 2007). She retired from active competition in 2009, and acts as a coach and trainer, and gives seminars.

Sporting successes 

(DNF – Did Not Finish)

References

External links 
 Offizielle Webseite von Katja Schumacher
 Triathlon.org Athlete profile: Katja Schumacher
 Triathlon Database: Katja Schumacher

1968 births
Living people
German female triathletes
Sportspeople from Heidelberg